Jangabad may refer to:
Jangabad, Isfahan
Jangabad, Razavi Khorasan